The following list of Carnegie libraries in Mississippi provides detailed information on United States Carnegie libraries in Mississippi, where 11 public libraries were built from 10 grants (totaling $145,500) awarded by the Carnegie Corporation of New York from 1904 to 1916. In addition, academic libraries were built at 2 institutions (totaling $90,000).

Key

Public libraries

Academic libraries

Notes

References

Note: The above references, while all authoritative, are not entirely mutually consistent. Some details of this list may have been drawn from one of the references without support from the others.  Reader discretion is advised.

Mississippi
Libraries

Libraries